Homestead is a rural town and locality in the Charters Towers Region, Queensland, Australia. In the  the locality of Homestead had a population of 48 people.

Geography 
The Flinders Highway traverses from east to south-west through the locality, passing through the town which is located in the east of the locality. The Great Northern railway line follows a similar route parallel and immediately south of the highway with the Homestead railway station servicing the town.

History 
In 1883, gold was discovered to the north of the town but it was not regarded as an important discovery and it was mined sporadically over the next 50 years.

The town of Homestead was surveyed by C.A.S Andrews on 23 December 1905. It takes its name from the Homestead Station pastoral run owned by  pastoralist W.D. Stewart; it was later known as Allandale Station.

Homestead Provisional School opened on 31 October 1893, becoming Homestead State School on 1 January 1909.

In the  the locality of Homestead had a population of 48 people.

Education 
The Homestead State School is a primary (P-6) school for boys and girls operated by the Queensland Government on the Flinders Highway. In 2016, the school had an enrolment of 8 students with 2 teachers (1 full-time equivalent) and 4 non-teaching staff (1 full-time equivalent).

References

External links 
 

Towns in Queensland
Charters Towers Region
Localities in Queensland